Marcel Dib (born 10 August 1960) is a French former professional footballer who played as a midfielder for SC Toulon, AS Monaco, FC Girondins de Bordeaux and Olympique de Marseille.

References

External links
 
 
 
 
 Stats in Monaco

Living people
1960 births
French people of Syrian descent
French footballers
Footballers from Marseille
Association football midfielders
France international footballers
Ligue 1 players
Ligue 2 players
SC Toulon players
AS Monaco FC players
FC Girondins de Bordeaux players
Olympique de Marseille players